Tara-Jane Stanley is an English rugby league footballer who plays as a  for York Valkyrie in the Womens Super League. She has played at representative level for England, and club level for Thatto Heath Crusaders and Castleford Tigers Women.

She was in the running for the inaugural Woman of Steel award in 2018, but lost out to Castleford Tigers teammate Georgia Roche.

Stanley began her rugby career playing for Moorfield Angels. She played for the English national team at the 2017 and 2021 Rugby League World Cup.

In 2018, Stanley was Player of the Match as England beat France 54-4 in Carcassonne.

Stanley won the 2022 Woman of Steel Award.

Test match appearances

References

External links
RFL introduce “Woman of Steel” award
Woman of Steel: Lois Forsell, Tara-Jane Stanley and Georgia Roche on shortlist

Living people
Year of birth missing (living people)
Castleford Tigers Women players
Place of birth missing (living people)
English female rugby league players
England women's national rugby league team players
Rugby league fullbacks
Rugby league players from Widnes
York Valkyrie players